The Kolors is an Italian pop rock band founded in 2010 by lead vocalist Stash Fiordispino, drummer Alex Fiordispino and Daniele Mona who plays synthesizers. The group has released three studio albums: I Want (2014), Out (2015) and You (2017). They are known for their hits "Everytime", lead single from their second studio album, and the collaboration "Pensare Male" with Elodie.

Since their debut the band has sold over 350.000 copies in Italy and won many accolades, including three Wind Music Awards, one MTV Italian Music Awards, one Kid's Choice Award and a participation at Sanremo Music Festival.

History
The band rose to prominence in 2010 when they became the resident band of Le Scimmie, a famous club in Milan. Since that they opened concerts for Gossip, Hurts and Paolo Nutini. In 2014 the singers and producers Elio and Rocco Tanica noticed the group, making their first album "I Want" and single "I Don't Give a Funk".

During 2015 The Kolors participated in the TV program Amici di Maria De Filippi,  in Elisa's team. In the finale on 5 June 2015 the band won the talent show and the Premio della Critica given by the journalists. During the last month in the TV program they release the english language single "Everytime", which reaches the sixth position of the Italian Singles Chart, receiving the platinum certification. On May 19, 2015, the band published their second studio album "Out", which peaked at number one of FIMI's albums chart, selling over 200.000 copies since that. The Kolors plays on 2015 MTV Italian Music Awards stage and released their second single from the album "Why Don't You Love Me?" earlier in September.

On April 15 2017, the release of the single "What Happened Last Night", featuring Gucci Mane and Daddy's Groove, was announced as a preview of their third recording project, "You". The album debuts at number four in the Italian charts, supported by the extracts "Crazy" and "Don't Understand".

In February 2018 the band competed at the Sanremo Music Festival with the song "Frida (Mai, mai, mai)", first completely in Italian language, which obtained a discarded success becoming their second single in the top ten of the Italian charts.  After the change of record label passing to Warner Bros Records, in May 2018 they release "Come le onde" with rapper J-Ax. From September 2018 the frontman Stash was chosen as professor and judge in the program Amici di Maria De Filippi.

In May 2019 they released the collaboration with the Italian singer Elodie "Pensare Male", which peaked at number 24 on Italian Singles Chart and received the platinum certification. The song became also the most Italian language listened song on radio in 2019. In September 2019 Stash was confirmed on the cast of Amici's nineteen serie. In May 2020 the band was cast for the spin-off Amici Speciali with the new single "Non è vero".

Philanthropy and controversy 
In 2016 at the MTV Italian Music Awards, the band is criticized for their behavior during the performance, during which Stash spits at the camera. Moreover, at the end of the song they get off the stage without listening to the conductor Francesco Mandelli who was about to give them the MTV History Award. Afterwards the singer apologized to the presenter and the award ceremony.

In 2018, after a guest performance at Amici, the host and producer of the format, Maria De Filippi, revealed a background of the band's entry into the talent show in 2016 by declaring: "When Stash and his band were chosen to be the challengers, the editorial staff told me they didn't exist: there were no documents proving who he was". The front-man replied, "I had falsified the documents: I said I was a year younger in the office because I thought I was too old to be in the school. That's the way it is in Naples: you always find the solution to the problem!" 

In the summer of 2018 Stash was involved in a fight to defend a girl who had been beaten in public by her partner. The singer says, "When you see an injustice, when you see that someone needs your kindness and someone else deserves your violence, act. Help, help yourselves."

Members

 Antonio "Stash" Fiordispino – vocals, guitar, piano, synthesizer, drums
 Daniele Mona – synthesizer, talk box, bass guitar
 Alex Fiordispino – drums

Discography

Studio albums

Compilation albums

Singles

As featured artist

References

Italian musical groups
English-language singers from Italy
Italian singer-songwriters
21st-century Italian singers
Musical groups from Campania